Richard O'Neil Burrell Jr. (born September 24, 1994) better known by his stage name Robb Banks (often stylized as Robb Bank$), is an American rapper, singer, songwriter, and record producer. Born in New York City, the rapper later moved to Broward County, Florida, at age six. He gained recognition with the Raider Klan movement in 2012 where he would debut his first mixtape Calendars and his follow-up mixtape Tha City in 2013.

Early life
Robb Banks was born Richard O'Neil Burrell Jr, on September 24, 1994, in New York City. He is the oldest child of Carol Johnson and Jamaican dancehall reggae recording artist Shaggy. Burrell spent the first six years of his life in New York before he and his mother moved to Broward County, Florida. He dropped out of high school his senior year and began working on music.

Career

2011–12: Calendars and rise to prominence
In 2012, after releasing his project Everyday Except Monday, with Matt Meyer Lansky as Tuesday Thru Sunday and a slew of other songs in 2011, Banks released his debut mixtape Calendars. The solo project predominately consisted of Robb rapping over beats by artists like Clams Casino and SBTRKT, and samples from Aaliyah and OutKast. The project became a hit on the microblogging platform Tumblr. He collaborated with producers like Nuri and SpaceGhostPurrp and began touring the country, developing an underground following.

2013: Tha City
After a brief hiatus, Robb began working on another project titled Tha City. He promoted the mixtape by releasing singles off the project including "Practice", "All the Way Live", and "On Me". Tha City was released on October 1, 2013. Prior to the release of this tape rumors had surfaced as to whether or not Shaggy was Robb's father, a fact that was formerly denied, but was soon confirmed by him to be true by making the cover for Tha City an old family photo of Banks and Shaggy. After the release of this mixtape, Robb went on a year-long hiatus as he continued touring and spreading his music around the world.

2014–15: 2PhoneShawty, No Trespassing and Year of the Savage

Throughout 2014, Robb began touring around the world and rarely released new music, only to show that he is still working on Year of the Savage. This was until the end of the year, when he began hinting new projects that have been in the work. 
In December, Banks put out the first (promotional) single for his debut commercial release, called "2PhoneShawty". It ended up being the only song recorded in 2013 on the entire album.

In 2015, he started working on a new batch of music for YOTS, which would mainly feature production from his new affiliate Nuez.
In April, Robb released two extended-plays: 2PhoneShawty and No Trespassing. The 2PhoneShawty EP consisted of outtakes from Year of the Savage, and No Trespassing was a collaboration between him and Memphis-born rapper Chris Travis, all recorded in 2014.

On August 13, 2015, Banks released the lead single for his album, titled "Pressure". After that he continued to promote YOTS by releasing a bunch of freestyled tracks. It was during one of these freestyles ("Throw It Up") that he confirmed the release date for his long-awaited album.

On October 2, 2015, Robb Banks released Year of the Savage through 300 Entertainment's Dorian Distribution.

2016–2017: C2: Death of My Teenage and Rich Gang

On September 27, 2016, Banks released a sequel to "Calendars" titled "C2: Death of My Teenage" which featured guest appearances from Los Hosale and XXXTentacion, co-founder of Members Only, a hip hop collective he would later join. The mixtape was preceded by the release of the single "BETT".

Following the release of the mixtape, Robb embarked on a tour of the same name, which was to feature fellow South Florida rappers Ski Mask the Slump God, Wifisfuneral and Ronny J. New Jersey's Da$h and Chicago's Warhol. SS were also set to open. Before the tour began, however, Da$h was arrested, causing him to be dropped from the tour.

In early January 2017, it was announced by Cash Money Records founder Birdman that Banks was the newest member of the label's Rich Gang subsidiary. Robb later confirmed that while he was a part of Rich Gang, he would continue to be an independent artist, choosing not to sign with Cash Money.

At this time, Banks also took to Twitter to announce a new project titled "Falconia", a sequel to his sophomore effort "Tha City".

On September 26, 2017, Banks released EP "Cloverfield 2.0" Months later, on December 27, 2017, he dropped another EP called "2: Pillz".

2018–2019: Molly World, Cloverfield 3 and Road to Falconia

On February 12, 2018, Banks released single "A Milli (4 M's)" and announced the upcoming release of "No Rooftops 2: Reloaded". Weeks later Banks would release a mixtape titled "Molly World" through Empire Distribution on March 9, 2018. Track 14 of "Molly World" "Let Da Beat Build" was made part of Cash Money's "Before Anythang" Documentary Soundtrack. On April 7, 2018, Bank$ and Wifisfuneral released lead single "EA" from their early 2019 collaborative project.

On April 27, 2018, Banks announced that his long rumored project Falconia will be arriving sometime in summer 2018. However, the date was delayed yet again.

On August 17, 2018, the third part of his Cloverfeild series dropped, mainly consisting of quality Falconia outtakes.

Later in 2019, after the January 11th joint effort with Wifi, Robb released "Road to Falconia" on December 13, 2019, which now serves as the full-length prelude to his long-awaited debut.

2020–2021: No Rooftops 2, The Leak (Vol. 1 and 2), and Few Pillz 
On April 16, 2020, Banks released his sequel tape to "No Rooftops" called "No Rooftops 2". This mixtape included beats from the early 2000s as well as few original instrumentals.

Later that year Robb dropped a two-part project titled "Tha Leak", with the first part being almost entirely mixtape original songs, and the second being various leftover material tracks from the same year.

On April 19, 2021, Banks released the EP "Few Pillz", which acts as the sequel to 2017's "2 Pillz".

2022–present: Falconia 
A year after his last project, on April 30, 2022, Robb released "Falconia", his most anticipated body of work yet, as a single project with 17 songs.
While on June 23, 2022, followed the album's deluxe version titled "Falcon of the Millennium", with 10 additional tracks, including the song "Outside".

Influences 
Banks' style is notorious for its heavy sampling of old school R&B, pop culture and Japanese anime. Robb states his inspiration to rap comes from Biggie Smalls and that one of his favorite artists of all time is British quiet storm-style singer Sade. Robb has also mentioned Lil' Wayne, Webbie, SpaceGhostPurrp, his father and Slug as an influence to his sound. His tag "I Think I Might Be Happy" is synonymous with his music and is taken from a scene of the U.S. version of Skins. Banks frequently makes references to Japanese anime Naruto and calls it his favorite anime of all time. Banks also refers to himself as "Femto" from the Japanese manga, Berserk.

Discography

Albums
 Year of the Savage (2015)
 Falconia (2022)
 Falcon of the Millenium - Falconia (Deluxe) (2022)

Mixtapes
 Calendars (2012)
 Tha City (2013)
 No Rooftops (2016)
 C2: Death of My Teenage (2016)
 Molly World (2018)
 Cloverfield 3 (2018)
 Connected (2019) with Wifisfuneral
 Road to Falconia (2019)
 No Rooftops 2 (2020)
 Tha Leak, Vol. 1 (2020)
 Tha Leak, Vol. 2 (2020)

EPs
 2PhoneShawty (2015)
 No Trespassing (2015) with Chris Travis
 Cloverfield 2.0 (2017)
 2 Pillz (2017)
 100 Year War (Golden Age) (2018)
 Few Pillz (2021)

Singles
 Practice (2013) feat. Sir Michael Rocks
 All the Way Live (2013)
 On Me (2013)
 2PhoneShawty (2014)
 24/7 (2015) feat. IndigoChildRick
 Solid (2015) with Chris Travis
 Pressure (2015)
 BETT (2016)
 ILYSM (2017) feat. Famous Dex
 Can't Feel My Face (2019) with Wifisfuneral
 Hentai (2019)
 Shootout (2022) with Lil Uzi Vert
 Lifted (2022) with Trippie Redd

References

External links

1994 births
Living people
21st-century American male musicians
21st-century American rappers
African-American male rappers
African-American songwriters
Banks, Robb
Members Only (hip hop collective) members
Rappers from Florida
Songwriters from Florida
Southern hip hop musicians
21st-century African-American musicians
American male songwriters